Domenico Rossi may refer to:
 Domenico Rossi (architect) (1657–1737), Swiss-born Italian architect
 Domenico Rossi (footballer) (born 2000), Italian football player
 Domenico Rossi (general) (born 1951), Italian general and politician
 Domenico Egidio Rossi (1659–1715), Italian architect

See also
 Domenico de' Rossi (1659–1730), Italian sculptor and engraver